The 1920 Chicago White Sox season was a season in American baseball. 

The team was in contention to defend their American League pennant going into the final week of the season. However, for all intents and purposes, the season ended on September 26, when news of the Black Sox Scandal became public.

Black Sox Scandal
Owner Charles Comiskey suspended the five players who were still active (the sixth, ringleader Chick Gandil, opted to retire after the 1919 season). 

At that time, the White Sox were only a half-game behind the Cleveland Indians, but went 2–2 over their last four games to finish two games out.  

They would not finish in the first division again until 1936.

Historic Record in 1920
The 1920 White Sox are one of only two teams in baseball history (The other being the 1971 Baltimore Orioles) to have four 20-game winners: Red Faber, Lefty Williams, Eddie Cicotte, and Dickie Kerr. (The '20 White Sox went one better than the '71 Orioles, in that they had four 21+ game winners.)

Regular season 
Shoeless Joe Jackson finished third in AL batting average, and Eddie Collins was fifth. Along with the St. Louis Browns, the team was the first in major league history to have three players with at least 200 hits each: Jackson, Collins, and Buck Weaver.

Season standings

Record vs. opponents

Roster

Player stats

Batting

Starters by position 
Note: Pos = Position; G = Games played; AB = At bats; H = Hits; Avg. = Batting average; HR = Home runs; RBI = Runs batted in

Other batters 
Note: G = Games played; AB = At bats; H = Hits; Avg. = Batting average; HR = Home runs; RBI = Runs batted in

Pitching

Starting pitchers 
Note: G = Games pitched; IP = Innings pitched; W = Wins; L = Losses; ERA = Earned run average; SO = Strikeouts

Other pitchers 
Note: G = Games pitched; IP = Innings pitched; W = Wins; L = Losses; ERA = Earned run average; SO = Strikeouts

Relief pitchers 
Note: G = Games pitched; W = Wins; L = Losses; SV = Saves; ERA = Earned run average; SO = Strikeouts

The White Sox became the first team to have four 20-game winners in the same pitching rotation.

League leaders 
Happy Felsch
 #4 in AL in home runs (14)

Shoeless Joe Jackson
 #3 in AL in batting average (.382)
 #3 in AL in slugging percentage (.589)
 #4 in AL in runs batted in (121)
 #4 in AL in on-base percentage (.444)

Lefty Williams
 #2 in AL in strikeouts (128)

Notes

References 
1920 Chicago White Sox at Baseball Reference

Chicago White Sox seasons
Chicago White Sox season
Chicago White